George Henry "Jerry" Upp (December 10, 1883 – June 30, 1937) was a pitcher in Major League Baseball in 1909 for the Cleveland Naps. He played in seven games, starting four of them, pitching 26.2 innings. His earned run average was 1.69.

External links

1883 births
1937 deaths
Major League Baseball pitchers
Cleveland Naps players
Lancaster Lanks players
Columbus Senators players
Williamsport Millionaires players
Altoona Rams players
Baseball players from Ohio
Sportspeople from Sandusky, Ohio